Rindal is the administrative centre of Rindal Municipality in Trøndelag county, Norway. County Road 341 branches off from County Road 340 in the village.

Over half of the population of the municipality live in the village of Rindal and its surrounding suburban areas. 

The village has retail and service industries, other industries, public administration and services, general industry (especially wood and food processing), and a hotel.  Several timber companies are located in Rindal.  There are several stores as well as the historic Rindal Church in the center of the village.

References

Rindal
Villages in Trøndelag